Gordon Earle Moore (born January 3, 1929) is an American businessman, engineer, and the co-founder and emeritus chairman of Intel Corporation. He is also the original proponent of Moore's law.

As of February 2023, Moore's net worth is reported to be $7 billion.

Education
Moore was born in San Francisco, California, and grew up in nearby Pescadero, where his father was the county sheriff. He attended San José State University for two years before transferring to the University of California, Berkeley, where he received a B.S. degree in chemistry in 1950.

In September 1950, Moore enrolled at the California Institute of Technology. While at Caltech, Moore minored in physics and received a Ph.D. in chemistry in 1954. Moore conducted postdoctoral research at the Applied Physics Laboratory at Johns Hopkins University from 1953 to 1956.

Scientific career

Fairchild Semiconductor Laboratory

Moore joined MIT and Caltech alumnus William Shockley at the Shockley Semiconductor Laboratory division of Beckman Instruments, but left with the "traitorous eight," when Sherman Fairchild agreed to back them and created the influential Fairchild Semiconductor corporation.

Moore's law

In 1965, Moore was working as the director of research and development (R&D) at Fairchild Semiconductor. He was asked by Electronics Magazine to predict what was going to happen in the semiconductor components industry over the next ten years. In an article published on April 19, 1965, Moore observed that the number of components (transistors, resistors, diodes, or capacitors) in a dense integrated circuit had doubled approximately every year and speculated that it would continue to do so for at least the next ten years. In 1975, he revised the forecast rate to approximately every two years. Carver Mead popularized the phrase "Moore's law". The prediction has become a target for miniaturization in the semiconductor industry and has had widespread impact in many areas of technological change.

Intel Corporation

In July 1968, Robert Noyce and Moore founded NM Electronics, which later became Intel Corporation. Moore served as executive vice president until 1975 when he became president. In April 1979, Moore became chairman and chief executive officer, holding that position until April 1987, when he became chairman. He was named chairman emeritus in 1997. Under Noyce, Moore, and later Andrew Grove, Intel has pioneered new technologies in the areas of computer memory, integrated circuits, and microprocessor design. On April 11, 2022, Intel renamed its main Oregon site, the Ronler Acres campus in Hillsboro, Gordon Moore Park, and the building formerly known as RA4, Moore Center, after their founder.

Philanthropy
In 2000, Moore and his wife established the Gordon and Betty Moore Foundation, with a gift worth about $5 billion. Through the foundation, they initially targeted environmental conservation, science, and the San Francisco Bay Area.

The foundation gives extensively in the area of environmental conservation, supporting major projects in the Andes-Amazon Basin and the San Francisco Bay area, among others. Moore was a director of Conservation International for some years. In 2002, he and Conservation International senior vice president Claude Gascon received the Order of the Golden Ark from Prince Bernhard of Lippe-Biesterfeld for their outstanding contributions to nature conservation.

Moore has been a member of Caltech's board of trustees since 1983, chairing it from 1993 to 2000, and is now a life trustee. In 2001, Moore and his wife donated $600 million to Caltech, at the time the largest gift ever to an institution of higher education. He said that he wants the gift to be used to keep Caltech at the forefront of research and technology.

In December 2007, Moore and his wife donated $200 million to Caltech and the University of California for the construction of the Thirty Meter Telescope (TMT), expected to become the world's second largest optical telescope once it and the European Extremely Large Telescope are completed in the mid-2020s. The TMT will have a segmented mirror 30 meters across and be built on Mauna Kea in Hawaii. This mirror will be nearly three times the size of the current record holder, the Large Binocular Telescope.

The Moores, as individuals and through their foundation, have also, in a series of gifts and grants beginning in the 1990s, given some $166 million to the University of California, Berkeley to fund initiatives ranging from materials science and physics to genomics and data science.

In addition, through the foundation, his wife created the Betty Irene Moore Nursing Initiative, targeting nursing care in the San Francisco Bay Area and Greater Sacramento.  In 2007, the foundation pledged $100 million over 11 years to establish a nursing school at the University of California, Davis.  The Moores have also been long-time benefactors of other Northern California institutions, including Stanford University (over $190 million as of 2022), University of California, San Francisco, and University of California, Santa Cruz.

In 2009, the Moores received the Andrew Carnegie Medal of Philanthropy.

Scientific awards and honors
Moore has received many honors. He was elected a member of the National Academy of Engineering in 1976 for contributions to semiconductor devices from transistors to microprocessors.

In 1990, Moore was presented with the National Medal of Technology and Innovation by President George H. W. Bush, "for his seminal leadership in bringing American industry the two major postwar innovations in microelectronics – large-scale integrated memory and the microprocessor – that have fueled the information revolution".

In 1998, he was inducted as a Fellow of the Computer History Museum "for his fundamental early work in the design and production of semiconductor devices as co-founder of Fairchild and Intel".

In 2001, Moore received the Othmer Gold Medal for outstanding contributions to progress in chemistry and science. Moore is also the recipient of the Presidential Medal of Freedom, the United States' highest civilian honor, as of 2002. He received the award from President George W. Bush. In 2002, Moore also received the Bower Award for Business Leadership.

In 2003, he was elected a Fellow of the American Association for the Advancement of Science. He was elected to the American Philosophical Society in 2005.

Moore was awarded the 2008 IEEE Medal of Honor for "pioneering technical roles in integrated-circuit processing, and leadership in the development of MOS memory, the microprocessor computer, and the semiconductor industry". Moore was featured in the documentary film Something Ventured which premiered in 2011.

In 2009, Moore was inducted into the National Inventors Hall of Fame. He was awarded the 2010 Dan David Prize for his work in the areas of Computers and Telecommunications.

The library at the Centre for Mathematical Sciences at the University of Cambridge is named after him and his wife Betty, as are the Moore Laboratories building (dedicated 1996) at Caltech and the Gordon and Betty Moore Materials Research Building at Stanford. The Electrochemical Society presents an award in Moore's name, the Gordon E. Moore Medal for Outstanding Achievement in Solid State Science and Technology, every two years to celebrate scientists' contributions to the field of solid state science.  The Society of Chemical Industry (American Section) annually presents the Gordon E. Moore Medal in his honor to recognize early career success in innovation in the chemical industries.

Moore was awarded the UCSF medal in 2016.

Personal life
Moore met his wife, Betty Irene Whitaker, while attending San Jose State College. They married in 1950 and had two sons, Steven and Kenneth.

Moore is an avid sport fisherman and actively pursues any type of fishing. He has extensively traveled the world, catching species from black marlin to rainbow trout. He has said his conservation efforts are partly inspired by his interest in fishing and his time spent outdoors.

In 2011, Moore's genome was the first human genome sequenced on Ion Torrent's Personal Genome Machine platform, a massively parallel sequencing device, which uses ISFET biosensors.

References

External links 

 
 
 
 
 
 
 
 
 
 
 
 Gordon Moore and Arthur Rock Oral History Panel interview, July 2014, California

1929 births
American billionaires
American technology chief executives
American physical chemists
California Institute of Technology alumni
Giving Pledgers
21st-century philanthropists
IEEE Medal of Honor recipients
Intel people
Living people
Members of the United States National Academy of Engineering
National Medal of Technology recipients
Businesspeople from San Francisco
Presidential Medal of Freedom recipients
San Jose State University alumni
UC Berkeley College of Chemistry alumni
Berkeley Student Cooperative alumni
American chief executives of manufacturing companies
People from Pescadero, California
Members of the American Philosophical Society
Scientists at Shockley Semiconductor Laboratory